James "Bo" LeMastus (born January 8, 1963) is an American businessman, professional racing driver, and former team owner. He races in the Stadium Super Trucks and formerly competed in the NASCAR Camping World Truck Series and ARCA Racing Series. He was also the co-owner of DGR-Crosley until 2021.

LeMastus is the CEO of Crosley Brands.

Business career
LeMastus began as an intern at Modern Marketing Concepts in 1983, while studying for a business degree at Western Kentucky University. LeMastus later became CEO of the company. In 1994, the company acquired the Crosley name from the former company operated by Powel Crosley Jr.

In October 1998, LeMastus and a group of investors purchased the defunct Charlestown Motor Speedway stock car track in Indiana, converting it into the Podium One Motoplex motocross track. In 2018, LeMastus purchased Salem Speedway and the adjacent Salem Municipal Airport in Indiana, partnering with fellow ARCA drivers Bill and Will Kimmel in the venture.

Racing career

Early career
LeMastus initially competed in the AMA Motocross Championship from 1987 to 1999. He later competed in Sports Car Club of America-sanctioned road course racing.

Stock car racing
In 2013, LeMastus purchased the equipment of Mark Gibson Racing and made his stock car debut at Daytona International Speedway in the ARCA Racing Series. He ran his first full season in the series in 2015, finishing sixth in points.

In 2018, LeMastus made his debut in the season-opener at Daytona. He was involved in a pile-up, and ended up finishing 30th after starting 16th. LeMastus continued to own DGR-Crosley with David Gilliland until 2021, though he remained involved in the team in a marketing role.

Off-road racing
In 2021, LeMastus joined the Stadium Super Trucks weekend at the Grand Prix of St. Petersburg. His series debut ended with his truck flipping and sliding into the wall, which resulted in a red flag that cut nearly half the race distance due to time constraints. At the first Mid-Ohio Sports Car Course weekend in June, he was involved in a fight with Bill Hynes in response to LeMastus' aggressive driving style towards Max Gordon, resulting in LeMastus throwing his steering wheel at Hynes before Hynes threw LeMastus' helmet to the ground twice. LeMastus increased his SST involvement for August's Music City Grand Prix as Crosley provided naming rights for the series, dubbing it the Crosley Stadium Super Trucks, and sponsored him and four other drivers (Jacob Abel, Arie Luyendyk Jr., Ricky Johnson, Jeff Ward).

Motorsports career results

NASCAR
(key) (Bold – Pole position awarded by qualifying time. Italics – Pole position earned by points standings or practice time. * – Most laps led.)

Camping World Truck Series

ARCA Racing Series
(key) (Bold – Pole position awarded by qualifying time. Italics – Pole position earned by points standings or practice time. * – Most laps led.)

Stadium Super Trucks
(key) (Bold – Pole position. Italics – Fastest qualifier. * – Most laps led.)

 Season still in progress
 Ineligible for series points

References

External links
 

Living people
NASCAR drivers
ARCA Menards Series drivers
Stadium Super Trucks drivers
People from Catawba County, North Carolina
1963 births